In 2012, Big Finish Productions began producing audio dramas featuring Doctor Whos fourth Doctor, as portrayed by Tom Baker. Baker had previously declined to feature in any Big Finish releases, but after recording a trilogy of full cast audio boxsets for BBC Audiobooks, he decided to participate. This was also part of a spin off series of the Monthly range.

Cast and characters

Cast

Notable Guests 

 David Warner as Cuthbert 
 David Sibley as The Eminence 
 Frazer Hines as Jamie McCrimmon 
 David Troughton as The Black Guardian 
 Gabriel Woolf as Sutekh 
 Joe Sims as Mark Seven 
 Siân Phillips as The Director 
 John Heffernan as The Nine

Episodes

Season 1 (2012)
This series of adventures is set between seasons 14 and 15 of the classic series, and features Louise Jameson reprising her role as Leela.

Special (2012)

Season 2 (2013)

This series of adventures is set between seasons 16 and 17 of the classic series, and features Mary Tamm and John Leeson reprising their roles as Romana and K9.

Season 3 (2014)

This series of adventures, like Season 1, is set between seasons 14 and 15 of the classic series and features Jameson reprising her role as Leela. Chronologically, it takes place after The Oseidon Adventure and the special Night of the Stormcrow.

Season 4 (2015)
A fourth series of adventures featuring Leela was released, this time also starring John Leeson as K9 and set during season 15 of the classic series.

Season 5 (2016)
A fifth series of adventures was released from January 2016, this time featuring Lalla Ward as the second incarnation of Romana and John Leeson as K9. The stories are set between seasons 17 and 18 of the classic series.

Season 6 (2017)
A sixth series was released beginning in January 2017, also featuring Lalla Ward as the second incarnation of Romana and John Leeson as K9.  The stories are set during season 18 of the classic series, prior to that season's E-Space trilogy.

Season 7 (2018)
A seventh series was released from January 2018, featuring Louise Jameson as Leela and John Leeson as K9. The stories are set after Season 4, during season 15 of the classic series. This is the first season to be released in 2 separate box sets rather than a new release every month. The final two stories feature Sutekh, a character based upon the Egyptian deity of the same name. Gabriel Woolf reprises his portrayal of Sutekh; Woolf had appeared as the character in the classic Doctor Who serial "Pyramids Of Mars".

Season 8 (2019)
An eighth series was released from January 2019, featuring John Leeson as K9 and a new companion WPC Ann Kelso played by Jane Slavin. The stories are set in between series 15 and 16 and are collectively titled The Syndicate Master Plan.

Season 9 (2020)
A ninth series was released from January 2020, featuring Lalla Ward as Romana II, John Leeson as K9 and Matthew Waterhouse as Adric. The stories are set in Season 18 during the E-Space Trilogy, specifically set between the stories State of Decay and Warriors' Gate. The format of the series changed from two box sets of four one hour stories, to two box sets of two two hour stories. A special  featuring Louise Jameson as Leela and John Leeson as K9 was released in May 2020.

Special (2020)

Season 10 (2021)
A tenth series was released from January 2021, featuring Louise Jameson as Leela and John Leeson as K9. Like Series 1 and 3, the stories are set between seasons 14 and 15 of the classic series.

Dalek Universe: Prologue (2021)
A prologue to the Tenth Doctor event Dalek Universe.

Season 11 (2022)
An eleventh series was released from January 2022, featuring the first appearance of Nerys Hughes as new companion Margaret. The stories will be set during season 14 of the classic series, specifically between The Deadly Assassin and The Face of Evil.

Season 12
A twelfth series was released from January 2023, featuring Louise Jameson as Leela and the return of Nerys Hughes as Margaret.

Season 13
A thirteenth series will be released from March 2024 in three volumes, featuring Christopher Naylor as Harry Sullivan and Eleanor Crooks as Naomi Cross. It will be connected with UNIT: Nemesis.

References

Audio plays based on Doctor Who
Big Finish Productions
Doctor Who spin-offs